Fang Glacier is a glacier on the west side of Fang Ridge, separating the old and new craters of Mount Erebus on Ross Island. It was charted by Frank Debenham of the British Antarctic Expedition, 1910–13, and named by him in association with Fang Ridge.

References 

Glaciers of Ross Island